Events from the year 1296 in Ireland.

Incumbent
Lord: Edward I

Births

Deaths
 Thomas FitzGerald, 2nd Baron Desmond